The Eight Diagram Pole Fighter is a 1984 Hong Kong film by Shaw Brothers, directed by Lau Kar-leung and starring Gordon Liu, Kara Hui and Alexander Fu (in his final film appearance). It was released as The Invincible Pole Fighters outside of Hong Kong and Invincible Pole Fighter in North America.

Alexander Fu died in a car accident before the filming of The Eight Diagram Pole Fighter was finished. The script was partly re-written after his death and Fu's character does not appear in the final showdown as originally written in the script.

The film is based on the Generals of the Yang Family (Yeung family in Cantonese) legends.

Plot 
With help from the treacherous Song dynasty general Pun Mei, the Khitan-ruled Liao dynasty army succeeded in trapping the loyal Song general Yeung Yip and his seven sons at Golden Beach. Yeung Yip and his sons were all killed or captured in the ambush, except for the 5th son and the 6th son who managed to escape. The 6th son returned home, but was severely traumatised by the events resulting in tantrums. Meanwhile, the 5th son sought refuge in a monastery in Mount Wutai, but the monastery leaders initially did not consider him calm enough to be a Buddhist monk. As blades were not allowed inside a monastery, he used his training in spears to practice with a pole, eventually developing the unique eight diagram pole fighting technique. When he finally appeared to have put his anger and past behind him, news broke that the Khitans had captured his younger sister, Yeung Baat-mui, who was looking for him. Now he must break his Buddhist vows, which include not killing any living being and not being bothered by worldly affairs, to save Baat-mui and exact his revenge.

Cast
 Note: The characters' names are in Cantonese romanisation.

Production 
Actors Alexander Fu Sheng, his younger brother David Cheung Chin-pang and Wong Yue were involved in an automobile accident in which Fu Sheng died. At the time of his death, he had not finished filming his role after which the director subsequently rewrote Fu's parts for Kara Wai's 8th child character.

Awards and nominations
1985 – 4th Hong Kong Film Awards
 Nominated – Lau Kar-leung, Best Action Choreography

References

External links
 Eight-Diagram Pole Fighter at Hong Kong Cinemagic
 
 

1984 films
Hong Kong martial arts films
Shaw Brothers Studio films
Kung fu films
Films directed by Lau Kar-leung
Works based on The Generals of the Yang Family
Films set in 10th-century Song dynasty
Films set in the Liao dynasty
Films about dentistry
1980s Hong Kong films